Leo Staar (born 24 July 1986) is an English actor, best known for his portrayals of Alec Jesmond in Call the Midwife and Inspector Lapointe in Maigret.

Biography
Leo Staar was born in London and grew up in Worthing, West Sussex. After graduating from drama school in 2009, he went straight into theatre, playing the roles of Ferdinand in The Tempest and Benvolio in Romeo and Juliet in the Cambridge Shakespeare Festival.  He also played Mr Wickham in a stage adaptation of Pride and Prejudice. In 2010, he appeared in Thea Sharrock's production of Terence Rattigan's After the Dance, alongside Benedict Cumberbatch at the National Theatre. That same year, he played a minor role in the Natonial Theatre Live cinema broadcast of Sir Nicholas Hynter's production of Hamlet, with Rory Kinnear in the title role. In 2011, he appeared in Josie Rourke's production of Much Ado About Nothing at Wyndham's Theatre, alongside David Tennant and Catherine Tate.

Staar became known to the public in 2013 when he landed his first major television role in the BBC medical drama Call the Midwife, where he played the recurring character Alec Jesmond, who became the boyfriend of main character Jenny Lee. He appeared in six episodes until the character died in a tragic accident. He then made guest appearances on Casualty, Lewis and Death in Paradise.

In 2015, Staar landed his next major television role when he was cast as Inspector Lapointe in the ITV detective drama Maigret, based on the books by Georges Simenon and starring Rowan Atkinson in the title role. The series ran from 2016 to 2017. In 2019, he played Denning in the BBC mini-series Summer of Rockets, opposite Toby Stephens and Keeley Hawes. He appeared in Fabio D'Andrea's music video The Sleeping Beauty, where he played a widowed father whose young daughter dreams of becoming a ballerina. The video was officially released in 2020.

In 2022, Staar appeared in the spy movie, The 355, opposite Jessica Chastain, Lupita Nyong'o, Penélope Cruz and Sebastian Stan.

Filmography

Film

Television

Live Streaming Theatre

Music Videos

Audio

Video Games

Theatre

References

External links
 United Agents - Leo Staar
 
 Leo Staar Instagram

Living people
21st-century English actors
People from London
Male actors from London
English male television actors
English male stage actors
English male film actors
1986 births